Vilius Armalas (born 21 July 2000) is a Lithuanian professional footballer who plays as a defender for Lithuanian A Lyga club Hegelmann.

Career

Before the second half of 2018–19, Armalas signed for Portuguese top flight side Benfica. Before the 2021 season, he was sent on loan to Hegelmann in Lithuania. Before the second half of 2021–22, he signed for Greek club Kavala. On 26 January 2022, Armalas debuted for Kavala during a 1–0 win over Trikala.

References

External links
 

2000 births
Living people
A Lyga players
Association football defenders
Expatriate footballers in Greece
Expatriate footballers in Portugal
FC Stumbras players
Lithuanian expatriate footballers
Lithuanian expatriate sportspeople in Greece
Lithuanian expatriate sportspeople in Portugal
Lithuanian footballers
S.L. Benfica footballers
Super League Greece 2 players
Kavala F.C. players
Sportspeople from Kaunas